The Royal St Christopher and Nevis Police Force is the police force responsible for law enforcement on Saint Kitts and Nevis. The force was formed in 1960, when it was a colony of Great Britain. The current Commissioner of the force is Ian Queely.

Past Commissioners/Chiefs of Police
 Mr. Celvon Geron Walwyn	2011  - 2015
 Mr. Austin Williams 2008 - 2011
 Mr. Robert W. Jeffers 2004 - 2008
 Mr. J. Calvin Fahie 1998 - 2004
 Mr. Bryan Reynolds 1995 – 1998
 Mr. Derrick O Thompson 1993 – 1995
 Mr. Stanley V Franks 1980 - 1993
 Mr. Joseph Francis 1979 - 1980
 Mr. Oriel Hector 1975 – 1979
 Mr. John Morgan Lewis 1973 – 1975
 Mr. John Henry Lynch – Wade 1969 – 1973
 Mr. Kenneth Duff 1969
 Mr. Walter V Samuels 1960 – 1964

References

Sources
 World Police Encyclopedia, ed. by Dilip K. Das & Michael Palmiotto.  by Taylor & Francis. 2004,  
 World Encyclopedia of Police Forces and Correctional Systems, 2nd.  edition,  Gale., 2006
 Sullivan, Larry E. et al.  Encyclopedia of Law Enforcement. Thousand Oaks: Sage Publications, 2005.

 
Government of Saint Kitts and Nevis
Law of Saint Kitts and Nevis